The word "intrabody" can be used in several contexts:

 Intrabody (protein), a type of antibody acting within a cell
 Pertaining to biological processes occurring within the body of a human or animal, such as signalling or movement of materials
 Pertaining to a phenomenon within the vertebral body, such as intrabody disc herniation that extrudes material into the vertebral body